Baron Artúr Feilitzsch (18 February 1859 – 15 June 1925) was a Hungarian politician, who served as Minister of Agriculture between 1905 and 1906.

References
 Magyar Életrajzi Lexikon	

1859 births
1925 deaths
Agriculture ministers of Hungary